Royal Bengal may refer to:

 Royal Bengal Airline, a dormant airline of Bangladesh 
 Royal Bengal tiger, the national animal of India and Bangladesh

See also
 Royal Bengal Tigers (sports team), a former cricket team